Francis Xavier Roque (October 9, 1928 – September 12, 2019) was an American Roman Catholic bishop who served the Archdiocese for the Military Services.

Biography
Born in Providence, Rhode Island, Roque was ordained to the priesthood on September 19, 1953, for the Roman Catholic Diocese of Providence.

On May 29, 1983, he was named titular bishop of Bagai and auxiliary bishop of the Roman Catholic Archdiocese for the Military Services, USA and was consecrated bishop on May 10, 1983.

Bishop Roque retired on September 15, 2004.

See also
 

 Catholic Church hierarchy
 Catholic Church in the United States
 Historical list of the Catholic bishops of the United States
 Insignia of Chaplain Schools in the US Military
 List of Catholic bishops of the United States
 List of Catholic bishops of the United States: military service
 Lists of patriarchs, archbishops, and bishops
 Military chaplain
 Religious symbolism in the United States military
 United States military chaplains

References

External links
 Archdiocese for the Military Services, USA Official Site
 Official site of the Holy See

Episcopal succession

1928 births
2019 deaths
Clergy from Providence, Rhode Island
Roman Catholic Diocese of Providence
20th-century American Roman Catholic titular bishops
21st-century American Roman Catholic titular bishops
American military chaplains
Religious leaders from Rhode Island
Military personnel from Rhode Island